George Trumbull Miller (28 November 1943 – 17 February 2023) was a Scottish-born Australian film and television director and producer. He directed The Man from Snowy River, The NeverEnding Story II: The Next Chapter, and Zeus and Roxanne.

Miller was born in Edinburgh on 28 November 1943. He started his career in 1966 working for Crawford Productions. "They trained you to do everything, they'd throw you in at the deep end to see if you sank or swam," he said. "I was one of the ones who swam – you wouldn't get that training anywhere now."

Miller said he was offered to direct Crocodile Dundee; but he had to turn it down, because he was going to make another film at the time, which ended up not being made.

Miller died from a heart attack in Melbourne on 17 February 2023, at the age of 79.

Filmography

References

External links
 

1943 births
2023 deaths
Australian film directors
Australian film producers
Australian television producers
Scottish emigrants to Australia
Fantasy film directors